Gabrielle Lamb (born in Savannah, Georgia) is a dancer, choreographer, and company director. In 2020, she was awarded a Guggenheim Fellowship.

Career 
She was trained at the Boston Ballet School before joining Les Grands Ballets Canadiens in 2000, where she was promoted to soloist two years later. She has also danced for Morphoses under the direction of Christopher Wheeldon. She has danced principal roles in works by George Balanchine, Nacho Duato, Mats Ek, Jiri Kylian, Jean-Christophe Maillot, Ohad Naharin, Peter Quanz and Christopher Wheeldon and has originated leading roles in new ballets by Mauro Bigonzetti and Shen Wei. Lamb has choreographed for Ballet Memphis, Milwaukee Ballet, Hubbard Street Dance Chicago, Royal Winnipeg Ballet, SALT Contemporary Dance, and BalletX. She is currently the choreographer and director for her company, Pigeonwing. In 2020, she started an outdoor program in collaboration with Guggenheim called "The Carpet Series."

List of Choreographed Works 
 2014 

HappenStance - Milwaukee Ballet

Dovetail

 2015 

Glas

I Am A Woman: Moult - Ballet Memphis

 2016 

Tessellations - The Joffrey Ensemble

Bewilderness - Pigeonwing

Fellowships and awards 
 2014 

Princess Grace Award for Choreography

New York City Center Fellowship

 2015 

CUNY Dance Initiative Residency

 2016 

Baruch College Performing Arts Center Residency

Creative Engagement Grant from the Lower Manhattan Cultural Council

2020

Guggenheim Fellowship

References

External links 
Morphoses Company website
Personal website

American ballerinas
Morphoses dancers
Living people
People from Savannah, Georgia
Year of birth missing (living people)
Dancers from Georgia (U.S. state)
21st-century American women